Federal Neuro-Psychiatric Hospital, Kware is a federal government of Nigeria speciality hospital located in Kware, Sokoto State, Nigeria. The current chief medical director is Shehu Sale.

CMD 
The current chief medical director is Shehu Sale.

References 

Hospitals in Nigeria